Riffe is an unincorporated community in Summers County, West Virginia, United States. Riffe is served by West Virginia Route 3 and West Virginia Route 12.

References

Unincorporated communities in Summers County, West Virginia
Unincorporated communities in West Virginia